Buckshaw Parkway is a British railway station which opened on 3 October 2011 on the Manchester to Preston Line, near Euxton Junction with the West Coast Main Line. It is one of Euxton's two railway stations being in Buckshaw Village, formerly the Royal Ordnance Factory (ROF Chorley) between Chorley and Leyland. It is close to the site of the four-platform Chorley ROF Halt, which was closed in 1964, remained virtually intact until the 1970s, but was finally cleared in the early 2000s.

History 

The station gained planning permission in 1999. It was put on hold due to a funding shortfall, but it was announced in 2009 that £3.3 million had been allocated by Lancashire County Council from the Community Investment Fund. Construction was expected to begin in early 2010 and be completed in the same year, but a further funding shortfall resulted in the designs for the ticket office being scaled down. Contractors started work in October 2010 and the station was completed by autumn 2011. The cost of the station now stands at £6.8 million. The station opened on 3 October 2011.

The first train arrived on time with journalists from a local paper, the Chorley Guardian, seeking interviews with waiting passengers. IT worker Alex Howarth was the first passenger from the station, whilst a Mr Brown was the first person to buy a ticket from the station.

Facilities 

The station has a staffed ticket office, Monday-Saturday 06:20-00:20
Sunday 08:15-23:50 . There is a free car park for around 200 cars.  Both platforms are fully accessible (via lifts), with train running information offered via digital CIS displays, automated announcements and timetable posters.

Services 

All services at the station are operated by Northern Trains. On Sundays, the service is hourly in each direction.

From the December 2013 timetable change, Windermere and Barrow-in-Furness services called at Buckshaw when they were attached to the rear of Blackpool North services. First TransPennine Express used to run the service from Manchester Airport to Blackpool North but this was passed on to the new Northern franchise on 1 April 2016.

Between May 2018 - May 2019, the current local stopping service from Manchester Victoria to Blackpool was temporarily curtailed here on weekdays (through running still applied during the evening) due to ongoing delays with the electrification work on the Manchester to Preston route (which was running two years behind schedule because of problems erecting electrification masts at several locations along the line).  Saturday and Sunday services were replaced by buses most weekends from May 2015 until November 2018 due to the late-running electrification work on the route. Weekend services resumed on Sunday 11 November 2018 after the completion of the electrification engineering work. Travellers from certain local stations needed to change trains here for Preston and Blackpool during this period.

Electric service commenced on 11 February 2019 utilising Class 319 electric multiple units.

There were previously three trains per hour in each direction, with one train per hour to Hazel Grove (and all the way to Buxton before the line was electrified), one train per hour to Manchester Airport both via Manchester Piccadilly running semi-fast then a local stopping service (as far as Bolton) to Manchester Victoria. Three trains per hour continued to Preston, with the two Piccadilly services continuing to Blackpool North. The December 2021 timetable change saw the removal of the Preston-Victoria service and in May 2022 the Airport services were changed to additionally call at Blackrod and Adlington due to the removal of the stopping service and very little services at these stations as a result. In December 2022, the Hazel Grove service was re-routed to terminate at Manchester Airport instead.

References

External links

Railway stations in Chorley
Railway stations opened by Network Rail
Railway stations in Great Britain opened in 2011
Northern franchise railway stations